Major (commandant in certain jurisdictions) is a military rank of commissioned officer status, with corresponding ranks existing in many armed forces throughout the world. When used unhyphenated and in conjunction with no other indicators, major is one rank above captain in armies and air forces, and one rank below lieutenant colonel.  It is considered the most junior of the field officer ranks.

Background
Majors are typically assigned as specialised executive or operations officers for battalion-sized units of 300 to 1,200 soldiers while in some nations, like Germany, majors are often in command of a company. 

When used in hyphenated or combined fashion, the term can also imply seniority at other levels of rank, including general-major or major general, denoting a low-level general officer, and sergeant major, denoting the most senior non-commissioned officer (NCO) of a military unit.  The term major can also be used with a hyphen to denote the leader of a military band such as in pipe-major or drum-major.

Historically, the rank designation developed in English in the 1640s, taken from French majeur, in turn a shortening of sergent-majeur, which at the time designated a higher rank than at present. The term Mayor for the head of a municipal government can also  be traced to the same French word.

The rank of major is also used in some police forces and other paramilitary rank structures, such as the Pennsylvania State Police, New York State Police, New Jersey State Police, and several others. As with a military major, this rank is most commonly the next rank above captain. The rank is equivalent to an inspector or commander in other large police departments or to the UK rank of superintendent.

Links to major ranks by country
Alphabetically sorted by name of country:

 Major (Canada)
 Major (France)
 Major (Germany)
 Major (Sri Lanka)
 Major (Sweden)
 Major (United Kingdom)
 Major (United States)

Insignia

Insignia of army majors

Insignia of air force majors

Insignia of naval infantry majors

Insignia of majors of other services

See also
List of comparative military ranks

References

Military ranks